The year 2010 is the 1st year in the history of the Fight Nights Global, a mixed martial arts and kickboxing promotion based in Russia. It started broadcasting through a television agreement with  REN TV.

List of events

Fight Nights: Battle of Moscow 1

Fight Nights: Battle of Moscow 1 was a mixed martial arts and kickboxing event held by Fight Nights Global on June 5, 2010 at the Crocus City Hall in Moscow, Russia.

Background
This event featured a kickboxing world title fights for the WAKO 72 kg Championship between Batu Khasikov and Ricardo Fernandes as headliner. Also this event featured 4-Man Lightweight Tournament.

Result

MMA Lightweight 70 kg Tournament bracket

Fight Nights: Battle of Moscow 2

Fight Nights: Battle of Moscow 2 was a mixed martial arts and kickboxing event held by Fight Nights Global on October 15, 2010 at the Crocus City Hall in Moscow, Russia.

Result

Kickboxing 63.5 kg Tournament bracket

MMA Welterweight 77 kg Tournament bracket

References

Fight Nights Global events
2010 in mixed martial arts
2010 in kickboxing
AMC Fight Nights